Honourable. Danladi Mohammed was the Commissioner for Economic and Planning for the Nigerian state of Gombe.

Early life and education

Danladi Mohammed was born to Muhammad Pantami and Amina Pantami on 29 September 1968. He began his education at Jan-Kai Primary School in Gombe State. He obtained a degree in economics at the University of Maiduguri. He obtained an MBA in finance, from Abubakar Tafawa Balewa University. He also attended a course on policy analysis and policy implementation in 2011 at Global Training Consultation London, an executive leadership management in the year 2014 at Howard, Washington, D.C., US, and a course on budgeting financing for gender equity at the Bowie State University in 2014.

References

External links
 Gombe State Government - Official Website

Living people
Nigerian politicians
Year of birth missing (living people)
University of Maiduguri alumni
Abubakar Tafawa Balewa University alumni